Tony Jefferies (24 April 1948 – 28 December 2021) was a British Grand Prix motorcycle road racer. He won the 1971 Isle of Man TT 350cc Junior TT. He won two more times at the TT in the 750cc Production class.

Jefferies died on 28 December 2021, at the age of 73. His son David Jefferies was also an Isle of Man TT victor.

References

1948 births
2021 deaths
350cc World Championship riders
500cc World Championship riders
British motorcycle racers
English motorcycle racers
Isle of Man TT riders
Sportspeople from Shipley, West Yorkshire